Otus may refer to:

 Otus (education), a K-12 educational technology company
 HMS Otus, two ships in the Royal Navy
 Otus (bird), genus of owls
 Otus (mythology), giant in Greek mythology, brother of Ephialtes, one of Aloadae
 Otus of Cyllene, hero in Greek mythology, killed by Hector in Trojan War
 USS Otus (ARG-20) (1940–1946), an internal combustion engine repair ship
 "Otus the Head Cat", weekly column in the Arkansas Democrat-Gazette by Michael Storey
 Otus (lens), high-performance lens series by Carl Zeiss AG
 Tonmi Lillman or Otus (1973–2012), member of a band Lordi
 "Of the United States" as in POTUS (President of the United States), FLOTUS (First Lady of the United States), and SCOTUS (Supreme Court of the United States)
 Moto E (2nd generation) 3G, a Motorola Android smartphone, codename otus
 Otus, a playable character from the 2016 Video Game Owlboy from D-Pad Studio
Operational taxonomic unit, operational taxonomic units in biology

People with the surname
 Erol Otus (21st century), American artist